The South Luzon Expressway (SLEX), signed as E2 of the Philippine expressway network and R-3 of the Metro Manila arterial road network, is a limited-access toll expressway that connects Metro Manila to the provinces in the Calabarzon region on the island of Luzon in the Philippines. A portion of the expressway from the Magallanes Interchange to the Calamba Exit is part of Asian Highway 26 of the Asian highway network.

The expressway also serves as a major utility corridor, carrying various high voltage overhead power lines and an oil pipeline. Notable power lines using the expressway's right of way for most or part of their route are the Sucat–Paco–Araneta–Balintawak transmission line, and the Biñan–Calamba and Calamba–Bay lines. The Magallanes–Alabang section of the expressway was also used to carry the Batangas–Pandacan oil pipeline. 

The South Luzon Expressway was built during the late 1960s as part of the government's plan to develop the areas adjacent to Metro Manila, with SLEX serving the south. The expressway was originally controlled by the Philippine National Construction Corporation (PNCC), until the expressway's operations and maintenance was transferred on May 2, 2010, to the South Luzon Tollways Corporation (SLTC) and Manila Toll Expressway Systems (MATES). Originally stretching from Magallanes, Makati to Alabang, Muntinlupa, it was extended in the late 1970s towards Calamba, Laguna at the south. In 1995, the expressway's Magallanes–Alabang section began to be rehabilitated and became part of the Skyway System as its at-grade section, as the elevated Skyway was being built above it up to Bicutan. From 2006 to 2009, the expressway underwent rehabilitation which modernized the road and its facilities, expanding the Alabang Viaduct as well as the section from Alabang to Calamba and connecting it to the Southern Tagalog Arterial Road in Santo Tomas, Batangas by June 2010.

Route description
 

The South Luzon Expressway cuts southwards from Manila up to the provinces in Calabarzon. The expressway consists of two sections. The first is a  segment of SLEX underneath the Skyway from Magallanes Interchange in Makati to Alabang Exit in Muntinlupa, called the Skyway At-Grade. The remaining  segment from Alabang to Santo Tomas, Batangas is part of the South Luzon Tollway segment, also called the Alabang–Calamba–Santo Tomas Expressway (ACTEX). Skyway At-Grade operations are held jointly by the Skyway Operations and Maintenance Corporation (SOMCO) and SMC Skyway Corporation (formerly Citra Metro Manila Tollways Corporation), while the South Luzon Tollway segment of SLEX is held by SMC SLEX, Inc. (formerly South Luzon Tollway Corporation), a concessionaire operated by Manila Toll Expressway Systems, Inc. (MATES) and a joint venture of the Philippine National Construction Corporation and the San Miguel Corporation-backed PT Citra Marga Nusaphala Persada Tbk group of Indonesia. In addition, the Alabang Viaduct is also known as SLEX Toll Road 1 (TR1), while the section from Filinvest Exit to Calamba Exit in Calamba, Laguna is also known as SLEX Toll Road 2 (TR2) and the section from Calamba Exit to Santo Tomas Exit is also known as SLEX Toll Road 3 (TR3).

The South Luzon Expressway continues the Osmeña Highway past the Magallanes Interchange, where it also meets Circumferential Road 4, particularly EDSA. The expressway runs through , spanning the cities of Makati, Pasay, Taguig, Parañaque, and Muntinlupa in Metro Manila and the provinces of Cavite, Laguna, and Batangas. From its northern terminus at Magallanes Interchange, the expressway follows a straight path southeast in parallel to the PNR South Main Line until the Bicutan Exit, where it slightly bends to the south towards the Alabang Exit. Two service roads run on either sides of the expressway from Sales Interchange to Alabang Exit, namely: West Service Road and East Service Road.

After its descent at Filinvest Exit, SLEX narrows to four lanes and mostly parallels the Manila South Road in Muntinlupa and northwestern Laguna, passing through the Susana Heights Exit connecting it to the Muntinlupa–Cavite Expressway. It continues as a straight roadway lined with billboards and passing through residential and industrial areas. Past the San Pedro Exit, the expressway then curves and ascends past the Petron and Caltex service areas. Past Santa Rosa Exit, South Luzon Expressway narrows into three lanes per direction, having guard rails as the median divider. At the Calamba Exit, the Pan-Philippine Highway concurrency ends as it leaves the expressway towards the west as Maharlika Highway. Past such exit, the expressway narrows to two lanes per direction, without exits and with bridges built with wide shoulders to accommodate future widening to three lanes. It follows a curved route paralleling the Pan-Philippine Highway (Maharlika Highway) from Calamba to Santo Tomas, Batangas. The expressway then curves as it enters Santo Tomas before it ends at kilometer 57.5, continuing towards Batangas City as the STAR Tollway.

History

Planning and construction 

The South Luzon Expressway was originally built during the late 1960s as the Manila South Diversion Road, South Superhighway, or Manila South Expressway as newer roads used to travel from and to Manila. It is the second roadway project completed by the Philippine National Construction Corporation, after North Luzon Expressway.

In the late 1970s, the expressway was extended by another  from Alabang up to Calamba, Laguna through the Manila South Expressway Extension project. It included the  Alabang Viaduct, which crosses over Alabang.

In 1982, South Superhighway from Magallanes to Calamba was renamed to Dr. Jose P. Rizal Highway, after the Philippine national hero Dr. José Rizal, by virtue of Batas Pambansa Blg. 264. In 1989, it was renamed to President Sergio Osmeña Sr. Highway, after the Commonwealth President Sergio Osmeña, by virtue of Republic Act No. 6760. The act was amended through Republic Act No. 7625 in 1992 to rename its portion from kilometer 28.387 in San Pedro, Laguna, southwards to Dr. Jose P. Rizal Highway.

In 1995, the rehabilitation of the  portion of SLEX from Magallanes to Alabang began as part of South Metro Manila Skyway Project Stage 1 that also includes the construction of the elevated Skyway above it up to Bicutan area. Thus, the Alabang Exit, which was also the expressway's former southern terminus, was designated as the concession boundary as PNCC decided to split SLEX into two concessions – the section from Magallanes to Alabang is made part of the Skyway System as the Skyway At-Grade, while the remaining section from Alabang southwards retains the South Luzon Expressway concession branding.

Expansion and rehabilitation 

Rehabilitation work on SLEX started in May 2006, with heavy traffic brought by construction work. Prior to its rehabilitation, the South Luzon Expressway section from Alabang to Calamba was mostly an expressway with a grass median and two lanes per direction. The Alabang Viaduct was widened from three to four lanes per direction with the viaduct's rehabilitation was completed in November 11, 2008, and the construction of Skyway Stage 2 from 2009 to 2011 caused traffic disruptions on the Bicutan–Alabang section (though mitigated by the use of the sosrobahu method to build and position the bridge piers). Rehabilitation work was finished in June 2009, expanding the Alabang–Santa Rosa section to eight lanes (four lanes per direction) and the Santa Rosa–Calamba section to six lanes (three lanes per direction).

One year and six months after the Alabang Viaduct was rehabilitated and widened and eleven months after the completion of rehabilitation and modernization of the expressway's Alabang–Calamba section, the operation and maintenance of the expressway was transferred from the government-owned Philippine National Construction Corporation (PNCC) to South Luzon Tollways Corporation (SLTC) and Manila Toll Expressway Systems (MATES) on May 2, 2010.

An extension of the expressway from Calamba to Santo Tomas was constructed from 2007 to June 2010 and opened on December 15, 2010, with the name Alabang–Calamba–Santo Tomas Expressway (ACTEX) and eventually connecting South Luzon Expressway to the STAR Tollway. To decongest traffic, the SLEX Elevated Extension project, originally known as Skyway Extension project, was constructed along the shoulder of the expressway in Muntinlupa from 2019 to 2021 and has connected the expressway's segment south of the Alabang Viaduct to Skyway Stage 2.

Future

Toll Road 4

The South Luzon Expressway Toll Road 4, also referred to as Toll Road 4 (TR4), is a  extension of South Luzon Expressway from Calamba (near its boundary with Santo Tomas, Batangas) to Lucena. Construction will be divided into five segments, with one additional extension to Mayao in Lucena on the revised project outline. The extension project is implemented by the Toll Regulatory Board and will be operated by the SMC SLEX, Inc. (formerly South Luzon Tollway Corporation). The extension would decongest the existing national road between Santo Tomas and Lucena, and provide a modern alternate route for travellers from Quezon to the Bicol Region. Right of way has been acquired for the first three segments between Santo Tomas and Tiaong, and ongoing for the remainder between Tiaong, Candelaria, and Tayabas. Right of way acquisition is ongoing as of 2019, and the groundbreaking ceremony was held on March 26, 2019, alongside the beginning of construction. The future expressway will start near the Ayala Greenfield Estate toll plaza in Calamba rather than in Santo Tomas after various project alignment revisions due to right-of-way issues. This part is two lanes per direction (with possible expansion to 3–4 lanes).

The expressway is expected to partially open in 2023.

Toll Road 5

The South Luzon Expressway Toll Road 5, also referred to as Toll Road 5 (TR5), will be the extension of South Luzon Expressway from Mayao, Lucena to the vicinity of Port of Matnog in Matnog, Sorsogon. It will be four-lane divided toll road with 28 interchanges and eight segments. It aims to decongest Andaya Highway and Pan-Philippine Highway, cut travel time from Manila to Naga by two to three hours, and to Matnog by six hours. 

On June 29, 2020, the Toll Regulatory Board issued a resolution to declare this project a Toll Road upon the request of, and based on the proposal submitted by the joint venture (JV) of the Philippine National Construction Corporation (PNCC) and San Miguel Holdings Corporation (SMHC). This project is separate from Quezon–Bicol Expressway, another proposed expressway between Quezon and Bicol Region.

On June 3, 2022, the Department of Transportation and San Miguel Corporation signed a Supplemental Toll Operations Agreement (STOA) for SLEX Toll Road 5 which was approved by then President Rodrigo Duterte 24 days later.

Other future plans
Other planned expansion projects in the SMC–PNCC joint venture pipeline with connections to either SLEX and the Skyway system include:

Toll

Previously employing closed and barrier toll systems, the South Luzon Expressway fully employs a closed road system, wherein the toll fee is charged based on vehicle class and the kilometers travelled from the entry to exit point. The expressway's toll system is integrated with the South Metro Manila Skyway Project and Muntinlupa–Cavite Expressway (MCX).

Toll collection is done upon exit at either SLEX, STAR Tollway, or MCX or at Skyway Main toll plaza. However, the expressway's section between Magallanes and Sales Interchanges is toll-free. 

The expressway fully implements an electronic toll collection (ETC) system, the Autosweep RFID, using RFID technology, and the system formerly used "E-Pass", which uses transponder technology. The ETC system is shared by the Skyway, STAR Tollway, NAIAX, MCX and TPLEX. Cash payments are still accepted although ETC is currently being maximized.

The toll rates by vehicle class are as follows:

Services

Service areas

The South Luzon Expressway currently has nine service areas, with four on the northbound and five on the southbound. All existing service areas occupy large land areas and have restaurants and retail space. The service areas also provide ETC reloading for Autosweep RFID users.

Lay-bys 
The South Luzon Expressway also has lay-bys, or emergency parking areas where motorists can stop for safety checks on their vehicles and other emergencies.

Exits

Toll Road 4

Notes

References

External links

 South Luzon Tollway Corporation
 Skyway O&M Corporation

Toll roads in the Philippines
Roads in Metro Manila
Roads in Laguna (province)
Roads in Cavite
Roads in Batangas
Roads in Quezon
Roads in Camarines Sur
Roads in Albay
Roads in Sorsogon
Roads in Camarines Norte